Patagonia Union High School (PUHS), is a public high school located in Patagonia, Arizona, which serves rural eastern Santa Cruz County, Arizona, including the communities of Patagonia, Sonoita, and Elgin. PUHS is a 1A school, with an enrollment of about 90 students in grades 9–12. Its mascot is the Lobo, the Spanish word for "wolf."

General information 
The student population is 54% low income (i.e., eligible for free & reduced-price lunches by the federal definition). Ethnically, the student population is 52% Anglo and 48% Latino.

National and state authorities have lauded the school for its academic excellence. PUHS has met the federal standard of "adequate yearly progress" every year since the passage of No Child Left Behind. The Arizona Department of Education has given the school its highest rating (Excelling) for the past three years. PUHS is the only "Excelling" high school in Arizona south of the Tucson metro area.

U.S. News & World Report recently recognized PUHS as a bronze medal school, a designation that indicates unusually good test scores for the school's demographics. Patagonia is the only bronze medal school in southern Arizona outside the Tucson metro area.

Great Schools rated PUHS at 7 out of 10.

History

In 1989 the Arizona Daily Star ran an article about recreational drug use being a rampant issue among the student body.

Academic awards 

Arizona Department of Education Report Cards
 2002–2003: Excelling
 2003–2004: Highly Performing
 2004–2005: Performing
 2005–2006: Excelling
 2006–2007: Excelling
 2007–2008: Excelling
 2008–2009: Excelling

No Child Left Behind Adequate Yearly Progress
 2002–2003: Met
 2003–2004: Met
 2004–2005: Met
 2005–2006: Met
 2006–2007: Met
 2007–2008: Met

U.S. News & World Report America's Best Schools
 Bronze Medal, 2007, 2008

Arizona Regional Brain Bee
 1st place: 2008
 2nd place: 2003, 2004, 2005, 2007, 2009

Arizona Academic Decathlon
 2nd place among 1A schools in regional & state competition, 2008

Willow Canyon Scholastic Bowl Invitational
 3rd Place, 2008

Athletic achievements

Baseball
 1st place, 1A South division, 2003 (Head Coaches: Brian MacKenzie & Alvaro Monteverde)

Basketball (Boys)
 3rd place, 1A South division, 2008 (Head Coach: Jim Paul)
 1st place, 1A South division, 2007 (Head Coach: Jimmy Lewis)

Basketball (Girls)
 4th place, 1A South division, 2007 (Head Coach: Michelle Shadrick)

Football
 3rd place, 1A South division, 2008 (Head Coach: Jim Paul)
 3rd place, 1A South division, 2007 (Head Coach: Brian MacKenzie)
 Co-State Champion, Class C division, 1991 (Head Coach: Bill House)
 State Champion, Class C division, 1988 (Head Coach: Bill House/Darrell Howell)
 State Champion, Class C division, 1987 (Head Coach: Bill House)

Volleyball (Girls)
 1st place, 1A South division, 2005 (Head Coach: Lance Sabbe)

Faculty and staff recognition
 Brian MacKenzie
 Arizona Educational Foundation Arizona Teacher of the Year finalist and Ambassador for Excellence, 2009
 Patagonia Union High School Teacher of the Year, 2008
 Veterans of Foreign Wars Arizona High School Citizenship Education Teacher of the Year, 2008
 Arizona 1A South Baseball Coach of the Year, 2003
 Lois Rodgers
 National Rural Teacher of the Year, 2001–2002
 Arizona Rural Schools Association Teacher of the Year, 2000–2001
 Susan Stropko
 Superintendent of the Year for Small & Rural Schools, 2004

Notable alumni
 Dinesh D'Souza, author, conservative activist, Reagan Administration policy analyst
 Jim Kolbe, Republican U.S. Congressman for southern Arizona, 1985–2007

References

Educational institutions established in 1926
Public high schools in Arizona
Schools in Santa Cruz County, Arizona
1926 establishments in Arizona
School districts in Santa Cruz County, Arizona